Rokiškis District Municipality is one of 60 municipalities in Lithuania.

Structure
District structure:   
 3 cities – Obeliai, Pandėlys and Rokiškis;
 9 towns – Čedasai, Duokiškis, Juodupė, Jūžintai, Kamajai, Panemunėlis, Panemunis, Salos and Suvainiškis;
 689 villages.
  
Population of largest elderships in Rokiškis District Municipality (2001): 
 Rokiškis – 16746
 Juodupė – 2043
 Kavoliškis – 1428
 Obeliai – 1371
 Pandėlys – 1024
 Kamajai – 681
 Skemai – 678
 Bajorai – 671
 Panemunėlis – 646
 Laibgaliai – 503

References

 
Municipalities of Panevėžys County
Municipalities of Lithuania